The William B. Hunt House is a historic home just outside Columbia, Missouri, USA, near the town of Huntsdale and the Missouri River. The house was constructed in 1862, and is a two-story, five bay, frame I-house. It incorporates a two-room log house which dates to about 1832. It features a central two-story portico.

It was added to the National Register of Historic Places in 1997.

References

See also
Historic houses in Missouri

Houses on the National Register of Historic Places in Missouri
Houses completed in 1862
Houses in Boone County, Missouri
1862 establishments in Missouri
National Register of Historic Places in Boone County, Missouri